List of Some Assembly Required episodes may refer to:
 List of Some Assembly Required (2007 TV series) episodes
 List of Some Assembly Required (2014 TV series) episodes